Beulah is an American situation-comedy series that ran on CBS Radio from 1945 to 1954, and on ABC Television from 1950 to 1953. The show is notable for being the first sitcom to star an African American actress, for being ABC TV's first hit situation comedy, and the first hit TV sitcom without a laugh track. The show was controversial for its caricatures of African Americans.

Radio 

Originally portrayed by a white male actor, Marlin Hurt, Beulah Brown first appeared in 1939 when Hurt introduced and played the character on the Hometown Incorporated radio series and in 1940 on NBC radio's Show Boat series. In 1943, Beulah moved over to That's Life and then became a supporting character on the popular Fibber McGee and Molly radio series in March 1944. In 1945, Beulah was spun off into her own radio show, The Marlin Hurt and Beulah Show, with Hurt still in the role. Beulah was employed as a housekeeper and cook for the Henderson family: father Harry, mother Alice and son Donnie. After Hurt died of a heart attack in 1946, he was replaced by another white actor, Bob Corley, and the series was retitled The Beulah Show.

When African-American actress Hattie McDaniel took over the role on November 24, 1947, she earned $1,000 a week for the first season, doubled the ratings of the original series and pleased the NAACP which was elated to see a historic first: a black woman as the star of a network radio program.

McDaniel continued in the role until she became ill in 1952 and was replaced by Lillian Randolph, who was in turn replaced for the 1953–54 radio season by her sister, Amanda Randolph.

For most of the radio show's run, the series ran as a 15-minute daily sitcom, a format popular among daytime serials.

Television
In 1950, Roland Reed Productions adapted the property into a TV situation comedy for ABC, and the Beulah TV show ran for three seasons, Tuesday nights at 7:30 Eastern Time from October 3, 1950, to September 22, 1953.

Most of the comedy in the series derived from the fact that Beulah, referred to as "the queen of the kitchen", has the ability to solve the problems that her employers cannot figure out. Other characters included Beulah's boyfriend Bill Jackson, a handyman who is constantly proposing marriage, and Oriole, a befuddled maid for the family next door.

For at least the first season, Beulah was filmed at Biograph Studios in the Bronx while Ethel Waters was simultaneously appearing on Broadway in The Member of the Wedding.

Cast changes

Ethel Waters starred as Beulah for the first year of the TV series before quitting in 1951.  When production moved to Hollywood,  Hattie McDaniel, star of radio's Beulah, was cast in the title role in  Summer 1951, but only filmed six shows before falling ill. She was replaced by Louise Beavers later in 1951. The McDaniel episodes were shelved pending an improvement of her health, and so the second season began in April 1952 starting with the Beavers episodes. The six McDaniel episodes were tagged onto the end of the second season, starting July 1952 and running until August 1952. It was around this time that McDaniel learned that she had advanced breast cancer. Beavers returned in the role of Beulah for the first part of the third Beulah season, which aired from September to December 1952.

Butterfly McQueen (McDaniel's fellow cast member from Gone With the Wind) starred as Oriole for the first season. Ruby Dandridge, who had played Mrs. Kelso in Cabin in the Sky and the voice of Oriole on the radio version of Beulah, replaced McQueen when the entire television cast was overhauled upon the arrival of Hattie McDaniel. Percy "Bud" Harris originally portrayed Bill, but he walked out on the part during the first season, accusing the producers of forcing him to portray an "Uncle Tom" character. He was succeeded in the role by Casablanca pianist Dooley Wilson, until Ernest Whitman followed radio co-stars McDaniel and Dandridge to TV in April 1952. The show was directed at various times by future sitcom veterans as Richard L. Bare and Abby Berlin.

Like the contemporaneous television program Amos 'n' Andy, Beulah came under attack from many critics, including the NAACP, which accused the show of supporting stereotypical depictions of black characters, with Beulah viewed as a stereotypical "mammy" similar to Aunt Jemima.

Episode status
A total of 87 episodes were filmed and produced of the television program. All 87 episodes were included in syndication packages throughout the latter half of the 1950s for local stations across the country. Only seven episodes are known to exist on 16mm format and circulate among collectors. All 87 episodes are housed in an archive in their original 35-millimeter format.

21 episodes of the radio series have survived to the present day, as does Bob Corley's audition tape. As a daily sitcom, preserving the radio version of Beulah was not as high of a priority as it was for primetime programming.

The following episodes can be found at YouTube and Archive.org.

 The New Arrival (air date June 10, 1952), with Louise Beavers
 Second Wedding (aka The Advice Columnist, air date June 20, 1952), with Louise Beavers
 The Waltz (air date August 5, 1952), with Hattie McDaniel
 Beulah Goes Gardening (air date August 12, 1952), with Hattie McDaniel

Cast

Radio

 Marlin Hurt: Bill Jackson, Beulah (1945–1946)
 Bob Corley: Beulah (1947)
 Hattie McDaniel: Beulah (1947–1952)
 Lillian Randolph: Beulah (1952–1953)
 Amanda Randolph: Beulah (1953–1954)
 Hugh Studebaker: Harry Henderson
 Mary Jane Croft: Alice Henderson
 Henry Blair: Donnie Henderson (1947–1953)
 Sammy Ogg: Donnie Henderson (1953–1954)
 Ruby Dandridge: Oriole Winston
 Ernest Whitman: Bill Jackson 
 Announcer: Marvin Miller (1947–1953)
 Announcer: Johnny Jacobs (1953–1954)
 Supporting cast members: Louise Beavers, John Brown, Lois Corbet, Dorothy Dandridge, Vivian Dandridge, Roy Glenn, Jess Kirkpatrick, Butterfly McQueen, Nicodemus Stewart

Television

Season 1: October 1950 – late 1951
 Ethel Waters: Beulah 
 Wiliam Post, Jr.: Harry Henderson
 Ginger Jones: Alice Henderson
 Clifford Sales: Donnie Henderson
 Percy "Bud" Harris: Bill Jackson (October 1950 to early 1951)
 Dooley Wilson: Bill Jackson (early 1951 to 1952)
 Butterfly McQueen: Oriole
 Leslie Uggams made at least one guest appearance as a young girl while Ethel Waters was the star of the show.

Season 2: April 1952 – August 1952
 Louise Beavers: Beulah (April–July)
 Hattie McDaniel: Beulah (July–August; six episodes)
 David Bruce: Harry Henderson
 Jane Frazee: Alice Henderson
 Stuffy Singer: Donnie Henderson
 Ernest Whitman: Bill Jackson 
 Ruby Dandridge: Oriole

Season 3: September 1952 – September 1953
 Louise Beavers: Beulah 
 David Bruce: Harry Henderson
 Jane Frazee: Alice Henderson
 Stuffy Singer Donnie Henderson
 Ernest Whitman: Bill Jackson 
 Ruby Dandridge: Oriole

References in other media
Beulah was referenced in the mockumentary C.S.A.: The Confederate States of America. In order to make the mock documentary more believable, mock commercials for historical goods and services were used such as Darkie Toothpaste and Coon Chicken Inn. Beulah was advertised as being a show (titled Leave It to Beulah, combining the name of the series with that of Leave It to Beaver, and featuring Beulah as a domestic slave) which Confederate families had grown up watching.

Notes

References
Bodroghkozy, Aniko. Museum of Broadcast Communications: Beulah
The Classic TV Archive

Listen to
Jerry Haendiges' Preview Listening Lounge: The Beulah Show (1954)
The Beulah Show at Internet Archive – 1946–1954.

External links

  

1945 radio programme debuts
1954 radio programme endings
1950 American television series debuts
1953 American television series endings
1940s American radio programs
1950s American radio programs
1950s American sitcoms
American Broadcasting Company original programming
American comedy radio programs
American black sitcoms
Black-and-white American television shows
CBS Radio programs
English-language television shows
Fictional maids
Radio programs adapted into television shows
Race-related controversies in radio
Race-related controversies in television
Comedy radio characters
Comedy television characters
Female characters in radio
Female characters in television
Ethnic humour
Television controversies in the United States
Television series based on radio series
Television shows filmed in New York City